Haugli is a surname of Norwegian origin which also appears as a farm name.  The name Haugli derives from the Old Norse word haugr which can be translated to mean hill, knoll, or mound. Other derivatives include Haugan, Haugen, and Hauge, all of which are also common Norwegian surnames. Haugli may refer to:

Håkon Haugli (born 1969), Norwegian politician from the Labour Party
Maren Haugli (born 1985), Norwegian long track speed skater who participates in international competitions 
Robby Roarsen Haugli (born 1974), Norwegian sprint canoer who competed in the late 1990s
Sverre Ingolf Haugli (1925–1986), Norwegian speed skater
Sverre Haugli (born 1982),  Norwegian long track speed skater who participates in international competitions 
Willy Haugli (1927–2009), Norwegian jurist, university director and police chief
Hans Christian Haugli, CEO of Telenor Objects, former CEO of Telenor Research and Innovation (R&I)

Norwegian-language surnames